Koi was the more southerly of the two main Pomo villages in the southeastern section of Clear Lake in Lake County, California, USA. Both it and the other triblet center, Elem, were located on islands near the shore and controlled territory on the mainland. It was located on Lower Lake Island, also called Indian Island.

References

Former settlements in Lake County, California
Former Native American populated places in California
Pomo villages